Winnie-the-Pooh is a 1969 Soviet animated film by Soyuzmultfilm directed by Fyodor Khitruk. The film is based on chapter one in the book series by A. A. Milne. It is the first part of a trilogy, along with two sequels: Winnie-the-Pooh Pays a Visit (1971) and Winnie-the-Pooh and a Busy Day (1972).

Storyline
Khitruk studied the original book by Milne first in English and only later in Russian, translated by Boris Zakhoder who became a co-writer of the first two parts of the trilogy. Khitruk had not seen the Disney adaptations while working on his own. He created the prototype drawings of the characters together with Vladimir Zuikov, a fellow animator from Film, Film, Film.

Khitruk followed the original book by A. A. Milne and based his first two parts of the trilogy on the Pooh's love for honey. However, while Milne accentuated the relationships between a boy (Christopher Robin) and his favorite toy Pooh, Khitruk removed Christopher Robin and made Pooh the leading character; his narrator is a "true" narrator who has no relation to the story whatsoever. Pooh is balanced by the Piglet; they are best friends and are present in all parts of the story. While Pooh always takes the initiative, he often seeks advice and help from the Piglet. The main reason to remove Robin was to exclude a vastly superior character (a human), and put all others at an equal level.

Khitruk followed his style and drew all scenes in two dimensions. His animation was relatively simple and slowly paced compared to other Milne adaptations. Instead, Khitruk put much emphasis on the dialogues and timing – every move of his characters and every character line are intended to bring hidden details and irony to viewers of all ages.

Cast
 Vladimir Osenev as the narrator. Osenev was a serious stage actor, who first despised the "childish" text and softened only after seeing the final result. Khitruk cast him because of his timbre and sarcasm.  
 Yevgeny Leonov as Winnie-the-Pooh. Khitruk tried several prominent actors without success – he favored Leonov, yet thought that his voice was too low. The sound engineer Georgy Martynyuk found a solution in speeding up his voice records. The same technique was used for Savvina who played the Piglet. 
 Iya Savvina as Piglet. Knowing that Savvina is a big fan of the Winnie-the-Pooh story, Khitruk invited her to review his first draft, and in the process cast her as the Piglet. Savvina based her intonation on Bella Akhmadulina.

Legacy and awards
In 1976, Khitruk was awarded the USSR State Prize for the Winnie-the-Pooh trilogy. The animation characters, as designed by Khitruk's team, are featured on the 1988 Soviet and 2012 Russian postal stamps; they are permanently painted on a public streetcar running through the Sokolniki Park, and their sculptures are installed in Ramenki District in Moscow.

When Khitruk visited the Disney Studios, Wolfgang Reitherman, the director of Winnie the Pooh and the Blustery Day that won the 1968 Academy Award for Best Animated Short Film, told him that he liked the Soviet version better than his own.

See also
 Soyuzmultfilm
 Winnie-the-Pooh
 A. A. Milne
 History of Russian animation

References

Further reading
Kevin Scott Collier. Fyodor Khitruk's Vinni-Pukh: Russia's Animated Winnie-the-Pooh. CreateSpace Independent Publishing Platform, 2018.

External links

 
 Winnie the Pooh at www.animator.ru
 Winnie the Pooh at Animatsiya.net, where it can be watched with subtitles in various languages including English

1969 animated films
1969 films
Soyuzmultfilm
Soviet animated films
1960s Russian-language films
Russian animated films
Winnie-the-Pooh featurettes
Films directed by Fyodor Khitruk
Animated featurettes